Bechara Jalkh Leonardo Oliveira or just Bechara (born February 25, 1976) is a Brazilian professional football midfielder, who last played for the Danish Superliga side Vejle Boldklub.

Career 
On February 1, 2008 Bechara moved from OB to Vejle Boldklub on a free transfer and signed a 3-year contract running from July 1, 2008 in November 2008 was released by Vejle.

External links
 Vejle Boldklub profile
 OB profile
 Career statistics
 Vejle Amtsfolkeblad

References

1976 births
Living people
Brazilian footballers
Brazilian expatriate footballers
Ceará Sporting Club players
Santos FC players
Fortaleza Esporte Clube players
Associação Desportiva São Caetano players
Marília Atlético Clube players
Associação Portuguesa de Desportos players
Aalesunds FK players
Odense Boldklub players
Vejle Boldklub players
Eliteserien players
Danish Superliga players
Expatriate footballers in Saudi Arabia
Brazilian expatriate sportspeople in Saudi Arabia
Expatriate footballers in Norway
Brazilian expatriate sportspeople in Norway
Expatriate men's footballers in Denmark
Brazilian expatriate sportspeople in Denmark
Association football midfielders
Sportspeople from Fortaleza